The men's Greco-Roman 63 kilograms at the 2000 Summer Olympics as part of the wrestling program was held at the Sydney Convention and Exhibition Centre from September 24 to 26. The competition held with an elimination system of three or four wrestlers in each pool, with the winners qualify for the quarterfinals, semifinals and final by way of direct elimination.

Schedule
All times are Australian Eastern Daylight Time (UTC+11:00)

Results 
Legend
F — Won by fall
WO — Won by walkover

Elimination pools

Pool 1

Pool 2

Pool 3

Pool 4

Pool 5

Pool 6

Knockout round

Final standing

References

External links
Official Report

Greco-Roman 63kg